Knapp Creek is a stream in the U.S. state of Iowa. It is a tributary to the Iowa River.

Knapp Creek most likely was named after a pioneer settler with the surname Knapp.

References

Rivers of Benton County, Iowa
Rivers of Johnson County, Iowa
Rivers of Linn County, Iowa
Rivers of Iowa